The Austin Braves were a Minor League Baseball team in the East Division of the Texas League and were affiliated with the Milwaukee/Atlanta Braves. Known as the Austin Senators from 1956 to 1964, they played at Disch Field. In 1965, they became the Austin Braves, finishing in last place with a record of 70–70. In 1966, the Braves finished in fourth place with a record of 67–73. In 1967, the team also finished in fourth place with a record of 69–71. In 1968, the Atlanta Braves moved the Austin Braves to Shreveport, Louisiana, where they played as the Shreveport Braves of the Texas League from 1968 to 1970, leaving the Greater Austin area without a professional baseball team until the Round Rock Express debuted in 2000.

Members of the Austin Braves who went on to play in the majors include Dusty Baker (1967), Bobby Cox (1966), Ralph Garr (1966–1967), Clarence "Cito" Gaston (1966–1967), Mike Lum (1966), Félix Millán (1965–1966), Ron Reed (1966), and George Stone (1967).

Timeline

External links
Austin, Texas at Baseball-Reference (Minors)

Baseball teams established in 1947
Defunct minor league baseball teams
Baseball teams in Austin, Texas
Professional baseball teams in Texas
Defunct Texas League teams
1947 establishments in Texas
1967 disestablishments in Texas
Sports clubs established in 1947
Defunct baseball teams in Texas
Baseball teams disestablished in 1967